Thomas Kelly (1837 - ?) was an Irish born recipient of the Medal of Honor and soldier in the Union Army during the American Civil War.

Biography 
Kelly was born in Ireland in 1837. He served as private in Company A of the 6th New York Volunteer Cavalry. He earned his medal in action at Front Royal, Virginia on August 16, 1864. His medal was issued on August 26, 1864. His date of death and burial location is unknown.

Medal of Honor Citation 
For extraordinary heroism on 16 August 1864, in action at Front Royal, Virginia, for capture of flag.

References 

1837 births
Irish soldiers
Year of death missing